The  Fromveur Passage, sometimes called St. Vincent's Channel, is a strait that lies between the island of Ushant and Kéréon lighthouse on Men Tensel Rock, off the coast of the French province of Brittany. It forms part of the northern limit of the Iroise Sea.

These currents, the second strongest in France after those of the Raz Blanchard in Normandy, make the passage a promising location for tidal power installations. GDF Suez plans to install a 0.5-megawatt test tidal turbine in the passage in 2014.

References

Landforms of Finistère
Straits of Metropolitan France
Landforms of Brittany